The 1983 Special Olympics World Summer Games were held in Baton Rouge, Louisiana, United States, on the campus of Louisiana State University from July 12–18, 1983. Events included athletics, Softball Throw and Swimming.

This was the first Special Olympics World Summer Games to feature Special Olympics New Zealand over thirty years ago, since then over 300 athletes have traveled to Special Olympics Events Internationally representing Special Olympics New Zealand.

References 

Special Olympics
1983 in multi-sport events
1983 in sports in Louisiana
1983 in American sports
Multi-sport events in the United States
Sports in Baton Rouge, Louisiana